Emily Ying Yang Chan is a humanitarian doctor and public health academic based in Hong Kong. She is the Assistant Dean (External Affairs) and Professor of the Chinese University of Hong Kong Faculty of Medicine, Professor at the Jockey Club School of Public Health and Primary Care, Director at the Centre for Global Health (CGH), Director of the Collaborating Centre for Oxford University and CUHK for Disaster and Medical Humanitarian Response (CCOUC), Director of the Centre of Excellence (ICoE-CCOUC) of Integrated Research on Disaster Risk (IRDR), Visiting Professor of Public Health Medicine at the Oxford University Nuffield Department of Medicine, Fellow at Harvard University FXB Center for Health and Human Rights, Honorary Professor at University of Hong Kong Li Ka Shing Faculty of Medicine, and Fellow at Hong Kong Academy of Medicine. She was appointed CEO of the GX Foundation in 2019.

Academic and medical training
She received her academic training from Johns Hopkins University, Harvard T.H. Chan School of Public Health, University of Hong Kong (HKU), The Chinese University of Hong Kong (CUHK), and London School of Hygiene and Tropical Medicine.

Research and experience
Her research interests include climate change and health, health and environmental co-benefits, disaster and humanitarian medicine, global and planetary health, violence and injury epidemiology, healthy settings, health needs and programme impact evaluation, evidence-based medical and public health interventions in resource deficit settings.

She has been involved in professional technical public health specialist training programmes of the Hong Kong SAR Government (2011–present), Chinese Center for Disease Control and Prevention (China CDC) (2013–2015) and the Health Emergency Response Office of China's National Health and Family Planning Commission (2013–2015). In addition, through the CCOUC China Ethnic Minority Health Project (EMHP) she established in 2009, her team has outreached more than 18,000 villagers in 49 remote, disaster-prone, resource-deficit rural settings in 11 provinces in China and trained about 700 students and scholars from CUHK, HKU, Oxford University and Harvard University. Professor Chan has also established research and training projects in Bhutan and Nepal. Moreover, the international online course "Public Health Principles in Disaster and Medical Humanitarian Response" developed by her team to examine the application of public health principles in planning and responding to disaster and humanitarian crises has more than 8,000 students enrolled from six continents since its launch in May 2014. Another 12 international online courses including "Climate Change and Health" and "Research Methodology for Disaster and Medical Humanitarian Response" developed by her team have also been launched.

Emily Chan is also co-chairperson of the World Health Organization Thematic Platform for Health Emergency & Disaster Risk Management Research Network (WHO H-EDRM Research Network), Co-chairperson of the World Health Organization COVID-19 Research Roadmap Social Science working group, and member of the Asia Pacific Science Technology and Academia Advisory Group of the United Nations Office for Disaster Risk Reduction (UNISDR APSTAAG) World Meteorological Organization SARS-CoV-2/COVID-19 Task Team, Scientific Working Group (SWG) of World Health Organization Centre for Health Development (WHO Kobe Centre, WKC), Alliance of International Science Organizations on Disaster Risk Reduction (ANSO-DRR) International Steering Committee, and the Third China Committee for Integrated Research on Disaster Risk (IRDR China), and serves in various technical consultation capacities for World Health Organization (WHO). She has extensive experience in serving as frontline emergency relief practitioner in the mid-1990s that spans across 20 countries.

Public services

 Member, Council of The Open University of Hong Kong (OUHK) (Appointed since 20 June 2018 for a period of three years)
 Member, Corruption Prevention Advisory Committee of the Independent Commission Against Corruption (ICAC), Hong Kong SAR Government (Appointed since January 2018)
 Member, Strategic Advisory Committee, Hong Kong Observatory (appointed since February 2016)

Awards and recognition
Emily Chan was awarded the 2007 Nobuo Maeda International Research Award of the American Public Health Association and has published more than 200 international peer-reviewed academic/technical/conference articles and seven of these appeared in The Lancet and Bulletin of the World Health Organization. Her community public health resilience and disaster-health related papers have been used as policy references within the WHO and the Health Emergency Response Office of China's National Health and Family Planning Commission. She has also received the Hong Kong Ten Outstanding Young Persons Award in 2004, Caring Physicians of the World Award in 2005, Ten Outstanding Young Persons of the World Award in 2005, Hong Kong Humanity Award in 2007, 2015 Leader of the Year Award in 2016, the National Geographic Chinese Explorer Award from the National Geographic Magazine, the 2017 UGC Teaching Award by the University Grants Committee of Hong Kong, a second prize in the 2018 National Teaching Achievement Award (High Education) from the Ministry of Education (MoE), PRC, and nominee of the biennial United Nations Sasakawa Award for Disaster Risk Reduction in 2019.

Publications

Peer-review journal publications

Human health security 
 Hung KKC, Walline HK, Chan EYY, Huang Z, Lo ESK, Yeoh EK, Graham CA. Health service utilization in Hong Kong during the COVID-19 pandemic – a cross-sectional public survey. Int J Health Policy Manag. 2020.doi:10.34172/IJHPM.2020.183
Chan EYY, Shahzada TS, Sham TST, Dubois C, Huang Z, Liu S, Ho JYE, Hung KKC, Kwok KO, Shaw R. Narrative review of non-pharmaceutical behavioural measures for the prevention of COVID-19 (SARS-CoV-2) based on the Health-EDRM framework. British Medical Bulletin. 2020;ldaa030. doi:https://doi.org/10.1093/bmb/ldaa030
Chan EYY, Sham TST, Shahzada TS, Dubois C, Huang Z, Liu S, Hung KKC, Tse SLA, Kwok KO, Chung PH, Kayano R, Shaw R. Narrative Review on Health-EDRM Primary Prevention Measures for Vector-Borne Diseases. Int J Environ Res Public Health. 2020;17(16):5981. doi:https://doi.org/10.3390/ijerph17165981
Chan EYY, Kim JH, Lo ESK, Huang Z, Hung H, Hung KKC, Wong ELY, Lee EKP, Wong MCS, Wong SYS. What Happened to People with Non-Communicable Diseases during COVID-19: Implications of H-EDRM Policies. Int J Environ Res Public Health. 2020;17(15):5588. doi:https://doi.org/10.3390/ijerph17155588
Wong ELY, Dong D, Griffiths S, Lui SF, Hung CT, Fung H, Chan EYY, Yeoh EK. What is appropriate PPE? Lessons learned from healthcare worker COVID-19 infection in Hong Kong. BMJ. 2020;370. doi:https://www.bmj.com/content/370/bmj.m2641/rr-0
Shang ESW, Lo ESK, Huang Z, Hung KKC, Chan EYY. Factors Associated with Urban Risk-Taking Behaviour during 2018 Typhoon Mangkhut: A Cross Sectional Study. Int J Environ Res Public Health. 2020;17(11):4150. doi:https://doi.org/10.3390/ijerph17114150
Chan EYY, Gobat N, Kim JH, Newnham EA, Huang Z, Hung H, et al. Informal home care providers: the forgotten health-care workers during the COVID-19 pandemic. Lancet. 2020. doi:https://doi.org/10.1016/S0140-6736(20)31254-X
 Chan EYY, Huang Z, Lo ESK, Hung KKC, Wong ELY, Wong SYS. Sociodemographic Predictors of Health Risk Perception, Attitude and Behavior Practices Associated with Health-Emergency Disaster Risk Management for Biological Hazards: The Case of COVID-19 Pandemic in Hong Kong, SAR China. Int J Environ Res Public Health. 2020; 17:3869.
 Wright K, Parker M, the Nuffield Council on Bioethics Working Group (Chan EYY). In emergencies, health research must go beyond public engagement toward a true partnership with those affected. Nature Medicine. 2020; doi:10.1038/s41591-020-0758-y
 Chan EYY, Hung KKC, Hung HHY, Graham CA. Use of tear gas for crowd control in Hong Kong. Lancet. 2019.
 Newnham EA, Gao X, Tearne J, Guragain B, Jiao F, Ghimire L, Chan EYY, Leaning J. Adolescents’ perspectives on the psychological effects of natural disasters in China and Nepal. Transcultural psychiatry. 2019; doi: https://doi.org/10.1177/1363461519893135
 Kayano R, Chan EY, Murray V, Abrahams J, Barber SL. WHO Thematic Platform for Health Emergency and Disaster Risk Management Research Network (TPRN): Report of the Kobe Expert Meeting. Int J Environ Res Public Health. 2019 Jan;16(7):1232.
 Tam G, Chan EYY, Liu S. Planning of a Health Emergency Disaster Risk Management Programme for a Chinese ethnic minority community. Int J Environ Res Public Health. 2019;16(6):1046.
 Chan EYY, Lam HCY, Lo ESK, Tsang SNS, Yung TKC, Wong CKP. Food-Related Health Emergency-Disaster Risk Reduction in Rural Ethnic Minority Communities: A Pilot Study of Knowledge, Awareness and Practice of Food Labelling and Salt-intake Reduction in a Kunge Community in China. Int J Environ Res Public Health. 2019;16(9):1478. doi:10.3390/ijerph16091478
 Ho JY, Chan EYY, Lam HCY, Yeung MPS, Wong CKP, Yung TKC. Is "perceived water insecurity" associated with disaster risk perception, preparedness attitudes, and coping ability in rural China? (a Health-EDRM pilot study). Int J Environ Res Public Health. 2019;16:1254.doi:10.3390/ijerph16071254
 Chan EYY, Man AYT, Lam HCY. Scientific evidence on natural disasters and health emergency and disaster risk management in Asian rural-based area. Br Med Bull. 2019;ldz002:1-15. doi:10.1093/bmb/ldz002
 Chan EYY, Man AYT, Lam HCY, Chan GKW, Hall BJ, Hung KKC. Is urban household emergency preparedness associated with short-term impact reduction after a super typhoon in subtropical city? Int J Environ Res Public Health. 2019;16(4):596.
 Chan EYY, Huang Z, Lam HCY, Wong CKP, Zou Q. Health vulnerability index for disaster risk reduction: application in Belt and Road Initiative (BRI) region. Int J Environ Res Public Health. 2019;16(3):380. doi:10.3390/ijerph16030380
 Chan EYY, Wright K, Parker M. Health-emergency disaster risk management and research ethics. Lancet. 2019;393:112-113.
 Chan EYY, Huang Z, Hung KKC, Chan GKW, Lam HCY, Lo ESK, Yeung MPS. Health Emergency Disaster Risk Management of public transport systems: a population-based study after the 2017 subway fire in Hong Kong, China. Int J Environ Res Public Health. 2019;16(2):228. doi:10.3390/ijerph16020228
 Xi Y, Chen R, Gillespie AL, He Y, Jia C, Shi K, Yao Y, Ma X, Liu W, Chan YY. Mental health workers’ perceptions of disaster response in China. BMC Public Health. 2019;19:11. doi:10.1186/s12889-018-6313-9
 Hung KKC, Mark CKM, Yeung MPS, Chan EYY, Graham CA. The role of the hotel industry in the response to emerging epidemics: a case study of SARS in 2003 and H1N1 swine flu in 2009 in Hong Kong. Globalization and Health. 2018;14:117. doi:10.1186/s12992-018-0438-6
 Lau DH, Chan EY, Wong CK. Effectiveness of a drama-and-song-based health education in increasing knowledge on household waste management in Manchu ethnic minority-based Dacao Village. International Journal of Behavioral Medicine. 2018;25 (supplement): S181.
 Chan EYY, Ho JYE, Huang Z, Kim JK, Lam HCY, Chung PPW, Carol KPW, Liu S, Chow S. Long-Term and Immediate Impacts of Health Emergency and Disaster Risk Management (Health-EDRM) Education Interventions in a Rural Chinese Earthquake-Prone Transitional Village. International Journal of Disaster Risk Science. 2018;9(3):319-330.
 Chan EYY, Lam HCY, Chung PPW, Huang Z, Yung TKC, Ling KWK, Chan GKW, Chiu CP. Risk perception and knowledge in fire risk reduction in a Dong minority rural village in China: A Health-EDRM education intervention study. International Journal of Disaster Risk Science. 2018;9(3):306-318.
 Pickering CJ, O'Sullivan TL, Morris A, Mark C, McQuirk D, Chan EY, Guy E, Chan GK, Reddin K, Throp R, Tsuzuki S, Yeung T, Murray V. The promotion of ‘grab bags’ as a disaster risk reduction strategy. PLOS Currents Disasters. 2018 Jul 6. Edition 1. doi:10.1371/currents.dis.223ac4322834aa0bb0d6824ee424e7f8.
 Chan EYY, Chiu CP, Chan GKW. Medical and health risks associated with communicable diseases of Rohingya refugees in Bangladesh 2017. International Journal of Infectious Diseases. 2018;68:39-43.
 Tam G, Chan EYY, Liu S. A web-based course on public health principles in disaster and medical humanitarian response: survey among students and faculty. JMIR Med Educ. 2018;4(1):e2. DOI: 10.2196/mededu.8495
 Smith AD, Chan EYY. Disaster risk reduction in Myanmar: a need for focus on community preparedness and improved evaluation of initiatives. Disaster Med Public Health Prep. 2017 Nov 20:1-5. doi: 10.1017/dmp.2017.107. [Epub ahead of print]
 Newnham EA, Balsari S, Lam RPK, Kashyap S, Pham P, Chan EYY, Patrick K, Leaning J. Self-efficacy and barriers to disaster evacuation in Hong Kong. Int J Public Health. 2017 Sep 20. doi: 10.1007/s00038-017-1036-8. [Epub ahead of print] 
 Chan EYY, Shi P. Health and risks: integrating health into disaster risk reduction, risk communication, and building resilient communities. Int J Disaster Risk Sci. 2017;8(2):107-108. 
 Chan EYY, Huang Z, Mark CKM, Guo C. Weather information acquisition and health significance during extreme cold weather in a subtropical city: a cross-sectional survey in Hong Kong. Int J Disaster Risk Sci. 2017;8(2):134-144. 
 Chan EYY, Murray V. What are the health research needs for the Sendai Framework? The Lancet. 2017; 390(10106):e35–e36. doi: 10.1016/S0140-6736(17)31670-7.
 Chan EYY, Guo C, Lee P, Liu S, Mark CKM. Health Emergency and Disaster Risk Management (Health-EDRM) in remote ethnic minority areas of rural China: the case of a flood-prone village in Sichuan. Int J Disaster Risk Sci. 2017;8(2):156-163.
 Lo STT, Chan EYY, Chan GKW, Murray V, Abrahams J, Ardalan A, Kayano R, Chung JWY. Health Emergency and Disaster Risk Management (Health-EDRM): developing the research field within the Sendai Framework paradigm. Int J Disaster Risk Sci. 2017. ;8(2):145-149.
 
 
 
 
 
 
 
 
 
 
 
 陈英凝, 高杨. 中国偏远农村及少数民族地区的医疗卫生现状及防灾需要. 伤害医学（电子版）2013年.
 Hung, K.K.C., Chan, E.Y.Y., & Graham, C.A. (2012) Disaster training: Lessons learnt from the 2008 Sichuan China Earthquake. International Paramedic Practice, June–August 2012, Vol1. No4. Pg 133–140

Climate change and environmental health 
 Liu S, Chan EYY, Goggins III WB, Huang Z. The Mortality Risk and Socioeconomic Vulnerability Associated with High and Low Temperature in Hong Kong. Int J Environ Res Public Health. 2020;17(19),7326. doi: https://doi.org/10.3390/ijerph17197326
Mohammad KN, Chan EYY, Wong MC, Goggins WB, Chong KC. Ambient temperature, seasonal influenza and risk of cardiovascular disease in a subtropical area in Southern China. Environmental Research. 2020:109546.
 Lam HCY, Huang Z, Liu Sida, Guo Chunlan, Goggins III WB, Chan EYY. Personal Cold Protection Behaviour and Its Associated Factors in 2016/17 Cold Days in Hong Kong: A Two‐Year Cohort Telephone Survey Study. Int J Environ Res Public Health. 2020;17:1672.doi:10.3390/ijerph17051672
 Gao Y, Chan EYY, Lam HCY et al. Perception of potential health risk of climate change and utilization of fans and air conditioners in a representative population of Hong Kong. Int J Disaster Risk Sci. 2020. https://doi.org/10.1007/s13753-020-00256-z
 Lam HCY, Chan EYY, Goggins W (2019).  Short-term Association Between Meteorological Factors and Childhood Pneumonia Hospitalization in Hong Kong: A Time-series Study.  Epidemiology, 30(S1):107–114.  2019.07.  doi:10.1097/EDE.0000000000000998
 Lam HC, Haines A, McGregor G, Chan EY, Hajat S. Time-Series Study of Associations between Rates of People Affected by Disasters and the El Niño Southern Oscillation (ENSO) Cycle. Int J Environ Res Public Health. 2019;16(17):3146.
 Chan EYY, Ho JY, Hung HH, Liu S, Lam HC. Health impact of climate change in cities of middle-income countries: the case of China. British medical bulletin. 2019.
 Lam HCY, Chan EYY. Effects of high temperature on existing allergic symptoms and the effect modification of allergic history on health outcomes during hot days among adults: an exploratory cross-sectional telephone survey study. Environ Res. 2019;175:142-147.
 Lam, H. C. Y., Hajat, S., Chan, E. Y. Y., & Goggins, W. B. (2019). Different sensitivities to ambient temperature between first- and re-admission childhood asthma cases in Hong Kong – A time series study. Environmental Research, 170, 487–492.
 Wang P, Goggins WB, Chan EYY. Associations of Salmonella hospitalizations with ambient temperature, humidity and rainfall in Hong Kong. Environment International. November 2018;120:223-230. doi:10.1016/j.envint.2018.08.014
 Lam HCY, Chan JCN, Luk AOY, Chan EYY, Goggins WB. Short-term association between ambient temperature and acute myocardial infarction hospitalizations for diabetes mellitus patients: a time series study. PLoS Med. 2018 July 17;15(7):e1002612. doi:10.1371/journal.pmed.1002612
 Wang P, Goggins WB, Chan EYY. A time-series study of the association of rainfall, relative humidity and ambient temperature with hospitalizations for rotavirus and norovirus infection among children in Hong Kong. Science of the Total Environment. 2018;643:414-422. doi: 10.1016/j.scitotenv.2018.06.189
 Lam HCY, Chan EYY, Goggins III WB. Comparison of short-term associations with meteorological variables between COPD and pneumonia hospitalization among the elderly in Hong Kong—a time-series study. International Journal of Biometeorology. 2018, May 5. [Epub ahead of print]
 Chan EYY, Lam HCY, So SHW, Goggins III WB, Ho JY, Liu S, Chung PPW. Association between ambient temperatures and mental disorder hospitalizations in a subtropical city: a time-series study of Hong Kong Special Administrative Region. Int. J. Environ. Res. Public Health. 2018; 15: 754. doi:10.3390/ijerph15040754
 Chan EYY, Wang SS, Ho JY, Huang Z, Liu S, Guo C. Socio-demographic predictors of health and environmental co-benefit behaviours for climate change mitigation in urban China. PLoS One. Published online 2017 Nov 27. Available from: https://doi.org/10.1371/journal.pone.0188661
 Chan EY, Gao Y, Li L, Lee PY. (2017). Injuries caused by pets in Asian urban households: a cross-sectional telephone survey. BMJ Open, 7(1), e012813. doi:10.1136/bmjopen-2016-012813
 Zhang N, Miao R, Huang H, Chan EYY. (2016). Contact infection of infectious disease on board a cruise ship. Scientific Report [Internet]. 2016 December 8; 6: 38790. doi: 10.1038/srep38790

Global health and primary care related/migration/urbanization 

 Kwok KO, Chan EYY, Chung PH, Tang A, Wei WI, Zhu C, Riley S, Ip M. Prevalence and associated factors for carriage of Enterobacteriaceae producing ESBLs or carbapenemase and Methicillin-resistant Staphylococcus aureus in Hong Kong Community. Journal of Infection. May 2020. doi: https://doi.org/10.1016/j.jinf.2020.05.033
 Yeung MPS, Chan EYY, Wong SYS, Yip BHK, Cheung PS. Hong Kong female's breast cancer awareness measure: Cross-sectional survey. World Journal of Clinical Oncology. February 2019; 10(2): 98-109.
 Wang F, Zhang L, Wu S, Li W, Sun M, Feng W, Ding D, Wong SYS, Zhu P, Evans GJ, Wing YK, Zhang J, Vlaanderen JJ, Vermeulen RCH, Zhang Y, Chan EYY, Li Z, Tse LA. Night shift work and abnormal liver function: Is non-alcohol fatty liver a necessary mediator? Occupational and Environmental Medicine. February 2019; 76(2): 83–89.
 Yan RH, Tse LA, Liu ZG, Bo JA, Chan EYY, Wang Y, Yin L, Li W, on behalf of PURE-China Investigators. Ethnic differences in spirometry measurements in China: Results from a large community-based epidemiological study. Respirology. July 2018;23(7):704-713.
 Yang J, Siri JG, Remais JV, Cheng Q, Zhang H, Chan KKY, Sun Z, Zhao Y, Cong N, Li X, Zhang W, Bai Y, Bi J, Cai W, Chan EYY, et al. The Tsinghua–Lancet Commission on Healthy Cities in China: unlocking the power of cities for a healthy China. Lancet. 2018, April 17. doi:10.1016/S0140-6736(18)30486-0 [Epub ahead of print].
 Li J, Yip BHK, Leung C, Chung W, Kwok KO, Chan EYY, Yeoh E, Chung P. Screening for latent and active tuberculosis infection in the elderly at admission to residential care homes: a cost-effectiveness analysis in an intermediate disease burden area. PLOS One. 2018 Jan 2. doi:10.1371/journal.pone.0189531
 Li J, Chung PH, Leung CLK, Nishikiori N, Chan EYY, Yeoh EK. The strategic framework of tuberculosis control and prevention in the elderly: a scoping review towards End TB targets. Infectious Diseases of Poverty. 2017; 6:70. doi:10.1186/s40249-017-0284-4

Books and book chapters 

Kayano R, Murray V, Clarke M, Chan EYY. (eds.) WHO Guidance on Research Methods for Health and Disaster Risk Management. Kobe: WHO; 2020.
Chan EYY, Lam HCY (eds.) Health-Related Emergency Disaster Risk Management (Health-EDRM). Basel: MDPI; 2020.
Chan EYY, Shaw R. (eds.) Public health and disasters - Health Emergency and Disaster Risk Management in Asia. Tokyo: Springer; 2020.
Chan EYY. Essentials for health protection: Four key components. Oxford: Oxford University Press; 2020. 256 p.        
Fakhruddin B, Bostrom A, Cui P, Yu L, Zou Q, Sillmann J, Johnston D, Jimenez V, Chan EYY, Chan GKW, Hung H, Huang Z, Wong CKP, et al. Integrated Research on Disaster Risk (IRDR) (Contributing Paper to GAR 2019). UNISDR; 2019.
Chan EYY. Disaster public health and older people (Routledge Humanitarian Studies). London: Routledge; 2019. 258 p.
Chan EYY. Climate Change and Urban Health. London: Routledge; 2019. 288 p.
Lo S, Lyne K, Chan E, Capon A, Chapter 2: Planetary health and resilience in Asia. In: Legido-Quigley H, Asgard-Jirhabdeh N, editors. Resilient and people-centred health systems: progress, challenges and future directions in Asia. WHO; 2018.
Chan EYY, Building bottom-up health and disaster risk reduction programmes. Oxford: Oxford University Press; 2018.
 刘思达，陈英凝。大型活动灾难的预防、监测和预警。刘中民主編，现代城市灾难医学救援。北京：清华大学出版社；2018年：38-40。[null Liu SD,] Chan EYY. Disaster prevention, monitoring and warning for mass events. In: Liu ZM, editor. Current medical assistants of the city disaster. Beijing: Tsinghua University Press; 2018: 38–40. Chinese.]
 Chan EYY, Ho JY. Urban community disaster and emergency health risk perceptions and preparedness. In: Shaw R, Shiwaku K, Izumi T, editors. Science and technology in disaster risk reduction in Asia: potentials and challenges. London: Academic Press; 2017: 95-110.
 Shaw R, Chan E, Fang L, Lu L, Shi P, Yang S, Chan G, Wong J, editors. Co-designing DRR solutions: towards participatory action and communication in science, technology and academia. Hong Kong, China: ASTAAG, IRDR and CCOUC; 2017, 98 p.
 Chan EYY, Hung KKC, Wong CKP, Jamtsho R, Ho JY. Community awareness and response in 2010 Bumthang Great Fire, Bhutan. In: Shaw R, Chan E, Fang L, Lu L, Shi P, Yang S, Chan G, Wong J, editors. Co-designing DRR solutions: towards participatory action and communication in science, technology and academia. Hong Kong, China: ASTAAG, IRDR and CCOUC; 2017: 57–58.
 Guo CL, Chan EYY, Chung PPW. Disaster response and health risk management during 2010 Hainan flooding in China. In: Shaw R, Chan E, Fang L, Lu L, Shi P, Yang S, Chan G, Wong J, editors. Co-designing DRR solutions: towards participatory action and communication in science, technology and academia. Hong Kong, China: ASTAAG, IRDR and CCOUC; 2017: 33–34.
 Ho JY, Chan EYY. Translating information from evidence to practice: the case of clenbuterol and food safety in China since late 1990s. In: Shaw R, Chan E, Fang L, Lu L, Shi P, Yang S, Chan G, Wong J, editors. Co-designing DRR solutions: towards participatory action and communication in science, technology and academia. Hong Kong, China: ASTAAG, IRDR and CCOUC; 2017: 64–65. 
 Huang Z, Chan EYY. Weather information dissemination during cold wave in a subtropical metropolis: a case study in Hong Kong. In: Shaw R, Chan E, Fang L, Lu L, Shi P, Yang S, Chan G, Wong J, editors. Co-designing DRR solutions: towards participatory action and communication in science, technology and academia. Hong Kong, China: ASTAAG, IRDR and CCOUC; 2017: 4–5.
 Chan EYY, Public health humanitarian responses to natural disasters (Routledge Humanitarian Studies) . London: Routledge; 2017. 
 陈英凝，刘思达。灾难现场评估。刘中民，张连阳主編，中国基层医生灾难创伤紧急救治技术手册。北京：中华医学电子音像出版社；2016年：12-19。[Chan EYY, Liu SD. Field assessment for disaster. In: Liu ZM, Zhang LY, editors. Handbook of disaster injury emergency treatment techniques for primary care physicians in China. Beijing: Chinese Medical Multimedia Press; 2016: 12–19. Chinese.]
 陳英凝，陳廣慧，黃嘉寶，黃喆，翁家俊，劉思達。中國農村健康及備災：進階培訓手冊。香港：CCOUC災害與人道救援研究所；2016。[Chan EYY, Chan GKW, Wong CKP, Huang Z, Yung TKC, Liu SD. Health and disaster preparedness in rural China: advanced training manual. Hong Kong: CCOUC and WZQCF; 2016. Traditional Chinese.]
 Chan EYY, Li W. Role of government and NGOs. In: Wolfson N, Lerner A, Roshal L, editors. Orthopedics in disasters: orthopedic injuries in natural disasters and mass casualty events. Springer-Verlag Berlin Heidelberg; 2016: 47–59.
 Chan EYY, Liu KS, Lee PY, Ling KWK, Wong CS. Training manual on Health and Disaster Preparedness in Rural China. WZQ; February 2016.
 陳英凝。公共衛生與通識教育︰跨單元議題剖析。香港︰香港教育圖書公司;2015。[Chan EYY. Public health and liberal studies: analysis of cross-module issues. Hong Kong: Hong Kong Educational Publishing Company; 2015. Chinese.]
 陳英凝。香港的城市災害準備情況。馬宗晉主編，十萬個為甚麼‧災難與防護。香港：商務印書館；2015年。
 陈英凝，朱迎佳，李宝仪，刘思达。中国农村健康及防灾培训手冊（简体版）。香港：CCOUC灾害与人道救援研究所，无止桥慈善基金；2015年6月。
 陳英凝，朱迎佳，李寶儀，劉思達。中國農村健康及防灾培訓手册。香港：CCOUC灾害與人道救援研究所，無止橋慈善基金；2015年3月。
 Chan EYY. Responding to disasters in low-income countries. In: Griffiths SM, Tang JL, Yeoh EK, editors. Routledge handbook of global public health in Asia. London: Routledge; 2014: 357–371.
 Chan EYY, Southgate RJ. Responding to chronic disease needs following disasters: a rethink using the Human Security approach. In: Hobson C, Bacon P, Cameron R, editors. Human security and natural disasters (Routledge Humanitarian Studies series). Tokyo: Routledge; 2014.
 Chan EYY, 1.4.3 Health needs of older people after earthquake. Wright J, Cave B. Chapter 1.4 Assessing health needs. In: Guest C, Ricciardi W, Kawachi I, Lang I, editors. Oxford handbook of public health practice. 3rd ed. Oxford University Press; 2013.
 陈英凝。汶川救援点滴。无国界医生志愿工作者合著，无国界医生手记。中国长沙：湖南科学技术出版社；2012年3月：120-3。
 Chan EYY. Sans frontieres under the sun. Hong Kong: Hong Kong Economic Press; July 2005. Chinese.

References

External links
 Collaborating Centre for Oxford University and CUHK for Disaster and Medical Humanitarian Response
 Oxford Nuffield Department of Medicine
 CUHK Faculty of Medicine
 Harvard FXB Center for Health and Human Rights
 United Nations Office for Disaster Risk Reduction
 China’s National Health and Family Planning Commission
CCTV Discovery Channel

Academic staff of the Chinese University of Hong Kong
Medical scholars of the University of Oxford
Hong Kong medical doctors
Chinese women physicians
Chinese physicians
Year of birth missing (living people)
Living people
Johns Hopkins University alumni
Alumni of the University of Hong Kong
Alumni of the Chinese University of Hong Kong
Alumni of the London School of Hygiene & Tropical Medicine
Harvard School of Public Health faculty
Harvard School of Public Health alumni
Chinese humanitarians
Sustainability advocates
Climate activists